Saiful Islam Badal is a Bangladeshi cinematographer. He won the Bangladesh National Film Award for Best Cinematography twice, for the films Aha! (2007) and Mrittika Maya (2013).

Selected films
 Bachelor -  2004
 Mad_e in Bangladesh - 2007
 Aha! - 2007
 The Floating Man - 2012
 Mrittika Maya - 2013

Awards and nominations
National Film Awards

References

External links
 

Bangladeshi cinematographers
Best Cinematographer National Film Award (Bangladesh) winners
Year of birth missing (living people)
Living people